This is a list of historic places in New Jersey.

List derived from the Historic Preservation Office New Jersey and National Registers of Historic Places and other sources, contains Historic Locations not on any official list.

Visualize this list as map :
https://tools.wmflabs.org/osm4wiki/cgi-bin/wiki/wiki-osm.pl?project=en&article=List_of_historic_places_in_New_Jersey

Contains items not in the national registry, see also National Register of Historic Places listings in Mercer County, New Jersey.
For a detailed list of the NJ only list : New Jersey Register of Historic Places

Camden and Amboy Railroad Branch Line Historic District

IDs  and 
Camden and Amboy Branch Line Right-of-way from Bordentown City to North Oak Blvd., North Brunswick, Middlesex County

(Revised SHPO Opinion, Boundary Extension includes Railroad Bridge No. 60.71. Boundary clarified 
(Previous ,  and )

North side of Rogers Avenue, about 100 yds. West of Mercer Street, and adjacent to a municipal parking lot

Extends through thirty-one municipalities in four counties.)

Camden and Amboy Branch Line Right-of-way from Bordentown City to North Oak Blvd., North Brunswick, Middlesex County
from Camden and Amboy Railroad.

See Main Entry / Filed Location:
Burlington County, Bordentown City

The entire line in osm is here :

Robbinsville Township

Brown-Gordon-Mahon House Site

Cole House Site

Cubberly-Combs Farmstead 

8 Sharon Road

Hammell-Hullick Farmstead [Site]

John Henry House Site 


Hutchinson House 

Hutchinson Mill-Pond Road

Hutchinson House Historic Archaeological Site


Imlay-Busby Farm

824 Allentown-Robbinsville Road
COE: 5/10/2006

Melrose Diner 

US Route 130

(Diner relocated by Smithsonian c.1988)

Mount House Complex 

Nottingham Way and NJ Route 33

See Main Entry / Filed Location:
Mercer County, Hamilton Township

Robbins House 

245 Windsor Road

Robbinsville First Baptist Church 

22 Robbinsville-Allentown Road

Totten-Van Ness House 

24 Robbinsville-Allentown Road

Willkens-Silver-Mitchell Farmstead 

482 US Route 130

(Demolished)

Windsor Historic District 

Main Street and Church Street; School Drive

Windswept Prehistoric Site


Trenton City

341 North Warren Street Site
 

341 North Warren Street

345 North Warren Street Site
 

345 North Warren Street

Old Hickory House
Old Hickory or Green/Atchley House, (Dresser House), 1716
120 Upper Ferry Road

418 Greenwood Avenue 

418 Greenwood Avenue

Abbott Farm Historic District

NHL: 12/8/1976

See Main Entry / Filed Location:
Mercer County, Hamilton Township

Academy Hanover Historic District 

Post Office Alley; Broad, Commerce, East Hanover, North Montgomery,
North Stockton, Olive, Perry, and Wood streets

(Local Certified District: 1/22/86)

Adams and Sickles Pharmacy 

1 West End Avenue

(Previous )

American Cigar Company Building 

176 Division Street

COE: 2/16/2011

Archeological Remains of Block 4B

Ardmore Section Historic District 

Roughly Bounded by S. Olden Avenue, Greenwood Avenue, Chambers
Street and Hamilton Avenue

Jonathan Bartley Crucible Co. Factory 

25-27 Oxford Street

Second Battle of Trenton / Battle of the Assunpink / Early Industry Historic District 

Open space along the Assunpink from S. Montgomery St. to Peace St.

Bellevue Avenue Colored School 

81 Bellevue Avenue

Bellevue Avenue 

Between Calhoun and Prospect streets

Bellevue Avenue Skating Park Club Building 

82-84 Bellevue Avenue

Benevolent Protective Order of Elks, Trenton Lodge 105 

120 North Warren Street

Berkeley Square Historic District 

Portions of Parkside, Riverside, and Overbrook avenues; and West
State Street (both sides)

Charles Brearley House 

73 North Clinton Avenue

Broad Street National Bank 

143 East State Street

"Brownstone" Workers Flats 

25-35 Stokely Avenue

(Demolished c.2009)

Cadwalader Heights Historic District 

Portions of Bellevue Avenue, North Parkside Avenue, Whitaker
Avenue, Belmont Circle, and Stuyvesant Avenue

Calhoun Street Bridge 

Calhoun Street over Delaware River

Central West- West End Historic District 

Between West State Street and Church Street and Murray Street and
Fowler Street

(Previous SHPO Opinions 4/7/88 and 12/15/88)

Chambersburg Historic District 

South Clinton, Mott, Hudson, Swan, Emory, Fulton, and Dye streets

Champale Brewing Company Office Building 

Lamberton Street

Clark Building 

123-127 North Warren Street

(Demolished 1985)

Henry Clay and Bock and Company, Ltd. Cigar Factory 

507 Grand Street

Delaware Inn 

Southeast Corner of Lamberton Street and Wooley Alley

COE: 5/30/2006

Delaware and Raritan Canal Historic District 

Entire Canal bed and all land 100 yards to either side of the center line

(Extends through five counties from the Delaware River to the
Raritan River)
See Main Entry / Filed Location:
Hunterdon County, Lambertville City

Douglass House 

Front and Montgomery streets

(Additional documentation approved 1/6/2005)

Early Trenton Transportation and Industrial Historic District

(Previous . Trenton Complex
Archaeology)

Elks - BPOE Building (Carver Center YMCA) 

40 Fowler Street

COE: 8/10/1998

Enterprise Pottery

650 New York Avenue

Ewing-Carroll Historic District 

Cottage Alley; Cross, Elizabeth, Ewing, and Southard streets

(Local Certified District: 7/22/86)

First Presbyterian Church and Cemetery 

120 East State Street

COE: 8/21/2001

Fitzgibbon & Crisp Factory 

20 Bank Street
COE: 1/17/1990

Golden Swan/True American 

101-107 South Warren Street

Home Rubber Company Factory 

NJ Route 129 and Cass Street

In and Out Social Club 

714-716 South Clinton Avenue

John A. Roebling Son's Company, Block 3 

Bound by Canal Street, Elmer Street, Clark Street and Hamilton Avenue

(See also John A. Roebling Son's Trenton Works HD (ID1790))

John A. Roebling Son's Trenton Works [Historic District] 

Roughly Bound by Hamilton, Clark, Elmer, Clinton, Mott, Hudson,
Millwood, Dye, Broad, and Canal Streets

(aka Colorado Fuel and Iron Corporation; See also John A.
Roebling, Block 3 (ID5204) and Roebling Machine Shop
(ID3279) (SR/NR Listed))

John Maddock & Sons Pottery Historic District 

15 and 21 Muirhead Street

Grant School 

159 North Clinton Avenue

Junior School # 2 

350 Cuyler Avenue

(a.k.a. Paul Robeson Elementary/ Hedgepeth-Williams Middle
School. See also Ardmore Section Historic District)

Greenwood-Hamilton Historic District 

Roughly bounded by Hamilton Avenue, Clinton Street, Tyler Street,
Greenwood Avenue, and Chestnut Street

(Local Certified District, 11/13/86)

Rudolph Kuser Mansion 

315 West State Street

Har Sinai Temple 

491 Bellevue Avenue
COE: 12/10/1990

Lamberton Street Buildings 

East side of Lamberton Street

(see also Lamberton Historic District)

H.D. Lee Company Factory Complex 

576 East State St.,

The Hermitage (General Philemon Dickinson House) 

46 Colonial Avenue

Higbee Street School 

20 Bellevue Avenue

"Hog Island" Cranes 

Trenton Marine Terminal, Lamberton Street

Lamberton Historic District 

Both sides of Centre Street from Ferry Street to dead end south of Lalor
Street, Lamberton Street from the Champale Factory to number 621 on
the west side and number 504 on the east side

(Previous SHPO Opinions: 8/9/93, 12/29/94)

Lamberton Street Interceptor 

Lamberton Street

(Previous )

Late Archaic Prehistoric Site

Maddock's China Company Dump Site 

(Previous )

Mansion House (Ellarslie, McCall House) 

Bounded by Parkside Drive, Stuyvesant Avenue and Abernathy Drive

(Cadwalder Park)

Pennsylvania Railroad Bridge at Trenton 

Pennsylvania Railroad (Amtrak Northeast Corridor Line) over the
Delaware River

Mercer Street Friends Center 

151 Mercer Street

Pennsylvania Railroad New York to Philadelphia Historic District 

See Main Entry / Filed Location:
Hudson County, Weehawken Township

Mercer Cemetery 

51 South Clinton Avenue

Mercer County Courthouse and Annex 

209 South Broad Street
COE: 8/6/2010

Mill Hill Historic District 

East Front, Mercer, Jackson, Market, Livingston, Clay, and Broad
streets; and Greenwood Avenue

Mott and Second Street Schools 

Centre Street and Second Street

National Porcelain Co. Building 

500 Southard Street

New Jersey Steel & Iron Company 

501 John Fitch Way

Old Barracks

Barrack Street
NHL: 11/28/1972

Old City Hall 

2-8 North Broad Street

Old Eagle Tavern 

429-431 South Broad Street

Packers Row 

Brunswick Avenue, Southard Street

Parker Public School 

117-125 Ferry Street

Philadelphia and Reading Railroad Freight Station 

260 North Willow Street

Prospect Street Presbyterian Church 

2 Prospect Street
COE: 5/19/1997

R.C. Maxwell Company 

725 East State Street

Riverview Bluff Site


Riverview Cemetery 

870 Center Street

Riverview Executive Park Archaeological Complex


Roebling Machine Shop 

675 South Clinton Avenue

Rosey Hill Residence Area Archaeological Site


(Trenton Complex Archaeology)

Sacred Heart Church 

343 Broad Street

St. Michael's Episcopal Church 

140 North Warren Street

St. Paul's Church 

337 Centre Street
COE: 7/2/2004
(Damascus Christian Church)

Shaky Bridge 

Stacy Park Footpath over the Perdicaris Waste Weir

South Broad Street Bridge 

South Broad Street over Assunpink Creek

South Clinton Avenue Pratt Through Truss Bridge

South Clinton Avenue over Amtrak Northeast Corridor Line

South Clinton Avenue Stone Arch Bridge

South Clinton Avenue over Assunpink Creek

State House Historic District 

West State and Barrack streets

State House Historic District (Boundary Increase) 

West State Street

COE: 1/17/1990
(State House Annex)

Stokely-Van Camp Factory 

Lalor Street at Stokely Avenue

(Previous )

W.H. Tatler Decorating Company 

225 Monmouth Street

Third Presbyterian Church 

131-137 North Warren Street

(Demolished 1985)

William R. Thropp Son's Company 

960 East State Street

Trenton Battle Monument 

Intersection of Broad and Warren streets; Brunswick, Pennington and
Princeton avenues

Trenton Central High School 

Chambers Street

(Between Hamilton and Greenwood Avenue.Demolished 2015)

Trenton China Company Dump Site and Associated Riverside Warehouses

Trenton City Hall 

309 East State Street

Trenton and Mercer County War Memorial 

West Lafayette Street

Trenton Office Complex Archaeological Site 

(Demolished)

Trenton Downtown Commercial Historic District 

North Warren, East State, and Hanover streets

Trenton Ferry Historic District 

506-512 Ferry Street

Trenton Friends Meetinghouse 

142 East Hanover Street

COE: 7/14/2004

Trenton Iron Company / New Jersey Steel and Iron Company /American Bridge Company / U.S. Steel Complex (Bridge and Ironworks Area) Site

(Trenton Complex Archaeology)

Trenton Makes Bridge 

Bridge Street over Delaware River

Trenton Psychiatric Hospital Historic District 

7717 Stuyvesant Avenue

Also located in:
Mercer County, Ewing Township

East Trenton Public Library 

701 North Clinton Avenue

COE: 6/29/2005

The Trenton Trust Company 

28 West State Street, Trenton

William Trent House 

15 Market Street
NHL: 4/15/1970

Assunpink Archaeological Historic District 

Also located in:
Mercer County, Hamilton Township

Underground Remains [Archaeological Site]

Bear Swamp Late Archaic Archaeological District

United States Post Office and Courthouse 

402 East State Street

(a.k.a. Clarkson S. Fisher U.S. Courthouse)

Bergen-Grover House 

474 Cranbury Road

Waterfront Stadium Archaeological Complex


Water Power Canal Site


Waters Edge Archaeological Complex


379 West State Street House

Woman Space 

Stuyvesant Avenue

Website http://www.womanspace.org/

Yard Avenue Historic District 

Portions of Yard, South Clinton, and Fairview avenues; East State
Street

(Historic District substantially demolished. Local Certified
District: 10/12/83.)

West Windsor Township

Aqueduct Mills Historic District Extension 

Harrison Street

Aqueduct Mills Historic District 

Harrison Street and vicinity to the Millstone River

See Main Entry / Filed Location:
Middlesex County, Plainsboro Township

Prehistoric Archeological Site 60


Archeological site 280
()

Archeological Site 283


Ben Boss Archeological Site

Clarksville Diner and Motel Units 

(Clarksville Diner subsequently moved to Iowa)

Covenhoven-Silvers-Logan House 

31 Logan Drive

Cranbury Neck Road Bridge

Cranbury Neck Road over the Millstone River

See Main Entry / Filed Location:
Middlesex County, Plainsboro Township

Delaware and Raritan Canal Bridge 

NJ Transit Princeton Line, Milepost 1.97 over Delaware and Raritan Canal

Delaware and Raritan Canal Historic District 

Entire Canal bed and all land 100 yards to either side of the center line

(Extends through five counties from the Delaware River to the
Raritan River)
See Main Entry / Filed Location:
Hunterdon County, Lambertville City

Grovers Mill Historic District 

Grovers Mill Road and Cranbury Road.

East Windsor Township

Jesse Anderson House (Holland House) 

Old Cranbury Road

Robert Ayres Farm 

261 Dutch Neck Road

Isaac Pullen/Lemuel Black House 

866 Old York Road

Ely Mount House 

108 One Mile Road

James Wilson House 

428 Old Trenton Road

Windsor Hollow Archaeological Site


Windsor Mill Archaeological Site


Ewing Township

Aeronautical Turbine Laboratory Complex Historic District 

Parkway Avenue

(Naval Air Warfare Center)

Bath House and Day Camp of the Trenton Jewish Community Center 

999 Lower Ferry Road

Bear Tavern Road/Jacob's Creek Crossing Rural Historic District 

Bear Tavern Road (County Route 579); Jacobs Creek Road

http://www.hmdb.org/marker.asp?marker=33228

See Main Entry / Filed Location:

Burt / Hendrickson / Atchley Farmstead 

Pennington Road (NJ Route 31)

Charles S. Maddock House

1076 River Road
EWING, NJ 08628

Delaware and Bound Brook (Reading) Railroad Historic District

Delaware and Raritan Canal Historic District 

Entire Canal bed and all land 100 yards to either side of the center line

(Extends through five counties from the Delaware River to the
Raritan River)
See Main Entry / Filed Location:
Hunterdon County, Lambertville City

First Presbyterian Church and Cemetery of Ewing 

100 Scotch Road

COE: 9/9/2008

Greens buried there.

Green-Harrop House (Joseph Green) 181 Crescent Avenue

James/Richard Green Estate 18th c. distillery or Old Cider Mill c.1739
248 West Upper Ferry Road
James/Richard Green Estate
18th c. distillery or Old Cider Mill c.1739

Blooming Grove / Green Farm Fisk Estate
(now Paulie's Anna Rose Restaurant)
234 West Upper Ferry Road

Green-Reading House

107 Wilburtha Road

107 Wilburtha Road

William Green House 

Green Farmhouse.

Green Lane

(College of New Jersey Campus, formerly Trenton State College)

http://williamgreenhouse.org
http://williamgreenhouse.org/cemetery/index.html

New Jersey State Police Headquarters Historic District

NJ State Highway Department Laboratory, Building 18 

999 Parkway Avenue

Odd Fellows Home 

1001 Pennington Avenue

COE: 1/24/1996

Odd Fellows Home Of New Jersey
1001 Pennington Road
Ewing, NJ 08618

Scudder-Reeder House
1780, 1850
295 West Upper Ferry

Jones Farm
Jones Farm, Bear Tavern Road
721 Bear Tavern Rd, 
Ewing, NJ 08628

 Also known as Rose Hill or Abner Reeder Farm

Reeder Creek Site West Locus


Temple-Ryan Farmhouse 

27 Federal City Road

Assunpink Archaeological Historic District 

See Main Entry / Filed Location:
Mercer County, West Windsor Township

Traction RR Bridge 

Princeton Division of the Trenton and Mercer County Traction
Corporation's interurban trolley line over the west branch of the
Shabakunk Creek

Bordentown Waterworks / White Horse Circle Prehistoric Site (28Me-37)

Trent Interlocking Tower

Trenton Psychiatric Hospital Historic District 

7717 Stuyvesant Avenue

See Main Entry / Filed Location:
Mercer County, Trenton City

West Trenton Railroad Station 

Sullivan Way

(Thematic Nomination of Operating Passenger Railroad
Stations)

Hamilton Township

C.C. Abbott Farmstead Archaeological Site


John Abbott II House 

2200 Kuser Road

Abbott-Decou Mansion 

58 Soloff Drive

(Homestead of Smuel and Lucy Abbott 1797)

Abbott Farm Historic District 

NHL: 12/8/1976

Also located in:
Burlington County, Bordentown City
Burlington County, Bordentown Township
Mercer County, Trenton City

Abbottville Archaeological Site
 

(Previously referred to as Cubberly-Asey House Site)

Bow Hill (Barnt DeKlyn House) 

Jeremiah Avenue

The Carney Rose Prehistoric Site
 

(Within the boundaries of the Tindal / Pearson Farmstead site.)

Crosswicks-Hamilton Square Road Bridge

Crosswicks-Hamilton Square Road over Doctor's Creek

Crosswicks Creek Railroad Bridge

Camden and Amboy Railroad over Crosswicks Creek

Also located in:
Burlington County, Bordentown City

Crosswicks Creek Site III (28-Bu-329) 

See Main Entry / Filed Location:
Burlington County, Bordentown City

DeLaval Steam Turbine Company Industrial Complex 

853 Nottingham Way

Delaware and Raritan Canal Historic District 

Entire Canal bed and all land 100 yards to either side of the center line

(Extends through five counties from the Delaware River to the
Raritan River)
See Main Entry / Filed Location:
Hunterdon County, Lambertville City

First Presbyterian Church of Hamilton Square 

3550 Nottingham Way
COE: 4/30/2004

Mount House Complex 

Nottingham Way and NJ Route 33

Also located in:
Mercer County, Robbinsville Township

North Crosswicks Historic District 

Bounded by Church Street, Mill Road, Cross Street, Old York Road,
South Broad Street, and Crosswicks-Hamilton Square Road

Grafton Farm Historic Complex 

110 Edgebrook Road

Oliphant Steel and Iron Company / National Radiator Company Industrial Complex 

1800 State Street

Gropps Lake Prehistoric Site
 

(Previously referenced in DOE of 11/29/77)

Isaac Pearson House 

Hobson Avenue at Emline Avenue

Groveville-Allentown Road Bridge
 

Groveville-Allentown Road over Doctors Creek

Robert Pearson House and Grounds Site
 

(Previous ; Also referred to as Robert Pearson
Farmstead)

Groveville Historic District

Hendrickson Farmhouse 

130 Uncle Pete's Road
COE: 7/17/2007

Hutchinson's Mill Site


Intersection Area [Archaeological Site] 

Hamilton Square Road and Nottingham Way

Iron Bridge Road Bridge
Iron Bridge Road over Crosswicks Creek
 

Also located in:
Burlington County, Chesterfield Township

Kuser Mansion 

390 Newkirk Avenue
COE: 5/3/2004

Lengyen Farm Complex 

Bordered by Old York Road, Crosswicks-Hamilton Square Road, and
Doctors Creek

Thomas Maddock Sons Company 

240 Princeton Avenue

(a.k.a. American Standard Plant)

Pennsylvania Railroad New York to Philadelphia Historic District

See Main Entry / Filed Location:
Hudson County, Weehawken Township

Railroad Trestle Vessel


Shady Brook Prehistoric Site
 ( and ) 

(Original SHPO Opinion found  Eligible, and  Not Eligible.

Site #1 - 18th Century Vessel


Tindall / Pearson Farmstead and Site
 

(Previous  as Isaac Pearson Mansion;
Property includes both architectural and archaeological
components)

Trenton Complex Archaeological Historic District (an expansion of the Abbott Farm Historic District)

Isaac Watson House 

151 Westcott Avenue

East Ward Avenue Bridge

East Ward Avenue over Peddie Lake

Kenneth Applegate House 

503 North Main Street

Route 33 Bridge
 (SI&A # 1115-150) 

NJ Route 33 over Rocky Brook

Samuel Sloan House 

238 South Main Street

(Additional documentation added 1997)

Stockton Street Historic District 

COE: 5/19/2005

Wyckoff Homestead 

421 North Main Street

Hopewell Borough

Delaware and Bound Brook (Reading) Railroad Historic District

See Main Entry / Filed Location:
Mercer County, Ewing Township

Greenwood Avenue Bridge

Hopewell Railroad Station 

Railroad Place

(Thematic Nomination of Operating Passenger Railroad
Stations)

Hopewell Borough Historic District 

Roughly bounded by the Borough Boundary, Hart Avenue, Lanning
Avenue, and West Broad Street

Province Line Road Bridge

Over Bedens Brook

(Demolished)
See Main Entry / Filed Location:
Somerset County, Montgomery Township

Vandyke House 

73 Washington Street

Hopewell Township-

Adams House 

Federal City Road

Bear Tavern Road Bridge

Bear Tavern Road over Jacobs Creek

Bear Tavern Road/Jacob's Creek Crossing Rural Historic District

Bear Tavern Road (County Route 579); Jacobs Creek Road

Also located in:
Mercer County, Ewing Township

Bear Tavern Road Bridge
 

Bear Tavern Road over Jacobs Creek

Enoch Blackwell House 

Blackwell Road

Joseph P. Blackwell Farm 

Blackwell Road

Thomas Blackwell House 

Elm Ridge Road

Cool Meadows Farm 

County Route 546

Delaware and Bound Brook (Reading) Railroad Historic District

See Main Entry / Filed Location:
Mercer County, Ewing Township

Hopewell Township

Delaware and Raritan Canal Historic District 

Entire Canal bed and all land 100 yards to either side of the center line

(Extends through five counties from the Delaware River to the
Raritan River)
See Main Entry / Filed Location:
Hunterdon County, Lambertville City

Nathaniel Drake House 

Pennington-Rocky Hill Road

R.A. Drake House 

Pennington-Rocky Hill Road

Gould House 

Province Line Road

Harbourton Historic District 

Harbourton / Rocktown and Harbourton / Mt. Airy roads

Hart / Hoch House 

Intersection of County Route 546 and Scotch Road

John D. Hart House 

Curlis Avenue

Hunt Farmstead (Rosedale Park) 

197 Blackwell Road

Also located in:
Mercer County, Lawrence Township

Kahn House 

Rocky Hill Road

Ichabod Leigh House 

Mount Rose-Rocky Hill Road

McDougal Farm and Barn 

Old Mill Road

Mount Rose Historic District 

County Route 569 and Pennington-Rocky Hill Road

Mount Rose Distillery Site
 

(SHPO Opinion name: Cider Mill)

Mount Rose General Store 

230 County Route 569 (Hopewell-Princeton Road)

Hart / Winner Farmstead Site


NJ Route 31 Circle 

NJ Route 31 at Mercer County Route 546 and Pennington Road

(a.k.a. Pennington Circle)

Hens Foot Corner/Terhune House 

Cleveland Road

Old Cleveland Farm 

Cleveland Road

Highfields 

Lindbergh Road

See Main Entry / Filed Location:
Hunterdon County, East Amwell Township

Oldis (Smith-Mershon) Farm 

County Route 546 (Pennington-Washington Crossing Road), approx. .4
mile west of intersection with County Route 611 (Scotch Road)

House 

Blackwell Road

House 

Pennington-Rocky Hill Road

House 

Federal City Road

Old Voorhees Farm House and Tenant House (Site 100 a and b)

Rocky Hill Road

Phillips Farm (Howell Living Historical Farm) 

Titusville, Hunter Road

Pleasant Valley Historic District 

Wooden's Lane; Hunter, Pleasant Valley, and Valley roads

Also located in:
Hunterdon County, West Amwell Township

Somerset Roller Mills (Jacobs Creek Grist Mill) 

NJ Route 29 at Jacobs Creek

Stout-Chorley House (a.k.a. Brick House) 

130 Hopewell-Rocky Hill Road (CR 518)
COE: 10/15/2015
(a.k.a. Brick House)

Joseph Stout House (Hunt House) 

Province Line Road

J. Thompson House and Barn 

Pennington-Rocky Hill Road

(I-95/695 Study Site #142)

Titusville Historic District 

River Drive

Upper Bellemont Farm

Colonel John Van Cleve Homestead 

Poor Farm Road

Jeremiah Van Dyke House 

Featherbed Road

Washington Crossing State Park 

NJ Route 29 and County Route 546
NHL: 1/20/1961

John Welling House 

Curlis Avenue at Birch Street

Jeremiah Woolsey House 

Pennington-Washington Crossing Road

Lawrence Township

Anderson-Capner House 

700 Trumbull Avenue

Arrowsmith-Marchesi House 

4276 Province Line Road

Benjamin B. Baker House 

208 Bakers Basin Road

COE: 9/12/2012

Baker-Brearley House 

Meadow Road and Princeton Pike

Carter Road Bridge over Shipetaukin Creek

Carter Road over Shipetaukin Creek

Delaware and Raritan Canal Historic District 

Entire Canal bed and all land 100 yards to either side of the center line

(Extends through five counties from the Delaware River to the
Raritan River)
See Main Entry / Filed Location:
Hunterdon County, Lambertville City

Cornelius Ferril House 

Cold Soil Road

Giordano Diner 

2944 Brunswick Pike (US Route 1)

Lewis Gordon House 

4240 Province Line Road

House 

Federal City Road

Lawrence Township

Hunt Farmstead (Rosedale Park) 

197 Blackwell Road

See Main Entry / Filed Location:
Mercer County, Hopewell Township

Joseph Inslee House 

Cold Soil Road

Isaac Brearley House 

2 Lewisville Road

(a.k.a. Spring Grove Farm)

Israel Stevens House 

2167 Brunswick Avenue

King's Highway Historic District 

US Route 206 and NJ Route 27, between Lawrenceville and Kingston

See Main Entry / Filed Location:
Mercer County, Princeton

Princessville Inn 

3510 Princeton Pike

(Demolished; de-registered 6/11/82)

Noah Reed House 

330 Cold Soil Road

Stuart L. Reed Farmstead Archaeological Site


Smith-Ribsam House 

45 Pine Knoll Drive

Vaccaro II Prehistoric Archaeological Site (29-Me-131)

Van Cleve House 

Rider College, US Route 206

John White House 

Cold Soil Road

Lawrence Township Historic District 

US Route 206 between Pennington-Lawrenceville Road and Carter
Road

William Gulick House 

3601 Lawrenceville-Princeton Road
COE: 7/26/2013

Lawrenceville School 

Main Street
NHL: 2/24/1986

Delaware and Bound Brook (Reading) Railroad Historic District

See Main Entry / Filed Location:
Mercer County, Ewing Township

Nathan Moore House 

256 Cold Soil Road

Joseph Pearson Farm 

Cold Soil Road

Salathiel Pearson House 

230 Cold Soil Road

Pennsylvania Railroad New York to Philadelphia Historic District

See Main Entry / Filed Location:
Hudson County, Weehawken Township

The Presbyterian Church of Lawrenceville 

US Route 206
COE: 6/3/1997

Pennington Borough

First Presbyterian Church of Pennington 

13 South Main Street

COE: 10/6/2008

Pennington Railroad Station 

Corner of Green Street and Franklin Avenue

Potential Subsurface Remains

Princeton

Archaeological Site


94 Bayard Lane 

94 Bayard Lane

Erkuries Beatty House 

19 Vandeventer Street
COE: 6/4/1997

Cherry Valley Road Site

Grover Cleveland Home ("Westland") 

15 Hodge Road
NHL: 6/23/1965

5 Cleveland Lane 

5 Cleveland Lane

10 Cleveland Lane 

10 Cleveland Lane

Coventry Farm 

549 Great Road

Delaware and Raritan Canal Historic District 

Entire Canal bed and all land 100 yards to either side of the center line

(Extends through five counties from the Delaware River to the
Raritan River)
See Main Entry / Filed Location:
Hunterdon County, Lambertville City

Drumthwacket (Olden-Pyne Houses) 

344 Stockton Road

Edgerstoune (Russel Hall) 

176 Edgerstoune Road
COE: 6/19/2000
(Hun School campus)

Albert Einstein House 

112 Mercer Street
NHL: 1/7/1976

Amelia Gulick House 

315 River Road

Joseph Henry House 

Nassau Street
NHL: 1/12/1965

(Princeton University Campus)

Donald Grant Herring Estate 

52, 72, and 75 Arreton Road

Institute for Advanced Study Historic District 

Einstein Drive

Jugtown Historic District 

Portions of Nassau and Harrison streets; Evelyn Place

King's Highway Historic District 

US Route 206 and NJ Route 27, between Lawrenceville and Kingston

Also located in:
Mercer County, Lawrence Township
Middlesex County, South Brunswick Township
Somerset County, Franklin Township

Kingston Mill Historic District 

Portions of River, Herrontown, and Princeton-Kingston roads, and the
Millstone River

Also located in:
Middlesex County, South Brunswick Township
Somerset County, Franklin Township

Lake Carnegie Historic District 

Lake Carnegie (Millstone River) between NJ Transit Princeton Branch
Railroad bridge (south end) and dam adjacent to NJ Route 27 (northend)

Also located in:
Mercer County, West Windsor Township
Middlesex County, Plainsboro Township
Middlesex County, South Brunswick Township

Maybury Hill (Joseph Hewes House) 

346 Snowden Lane
NHL: 11/11/1971

Morven 

55 Stockton Street
NHL: 7/17/1971

Mountain Avenue Historic District 

73-143 Mountain Avenue

Mountain Lakes Preserve Rural Historic District 

US Route 206

Nassau Hall 

Nassau Street
NHL: 10/9/1960

(Princeton University Campus)

Old Kingston Bridge

Old NJ Route 27 over Millstone River

(Listed as part of Kingston Mill Historic District)
Also located in:
Middlesex County, South Brunswick Township
Somerset County, Franklin Township

Prehistoric Archaeological Site


President's House (Maclean House) 

Nassau Street
NHL: 7/17/1971

(Princeton University Campus)

Princeton Battlefield 

Princeton Battlefield State Park
NHL: 1/20/1961

Princeton Battlefield Addendum 

Princeton Battlefield State Park

Princeton Battlefield / Stony Brook Village Historic District

Portions of Mercer, Lawrenceville, Quaker, and Stockton roads

(Expands previous Princeton Battlefield listings)

Princeton Battlefield/Stony Brook Village Historic District Boundary Increase
 (IAS Site)

Princeton Historic District 

Parts of Mercer, Nassau, Prospect, Williams, Stockton, Wiggins, and
Olden streets; Alexander, Springdale and College roads; Lovers Lane
and Library Place

(See also National Historic Landmark listings)

Princeton Railroad Station 

University Place

(Thematic Nomination of Operating Passenger Railroad
Stations)

Princeton Ice Company

Prospect (Woodrow Wilson House) 

Princeton University campus
NHL: 2/4/1985
(National Historic Landmark, 2/4/85)

P. Tulane Historic Site


Roadbed of the Trenton and Mercer County Inter-Urban Trolley Line [Site]

Upton Sinclair House 

Province Line Road

Stony Brook Friend's Meeting House 

470 Quaker Road

Tusculum 

Cherry Hill Road

University Cottage Club 

51 Prospect Avenue

Witherspoon/John Street Historic District 

John Street, (both sides), south to Wiggins Street, Witherspoon (both sides) north to Birch Lane

(Previous SHPO opinion date 2/22/90)

Witherspoon Street School for Colored Children 

35 Quarry Street

COE: 6/12/2003

Lake Carnegie Historic District 

Lake Carnegie (Millstone River) between NJ Transit Princeton Branch
Railroad bridge (south end) and dam adjacent to NJ Route 27 (north
end)

See Main Entry / Filed Location:
Mercer County, Princeton

Maxkw Site
 

(Pronounced "muh - kwah")

9-Mile Marker 

US Route 1

(Removed by NJDOT)

Penns Neck Baptist Church 

US Route 1 and Washington Road

Penns Neck Cemetery 

North of Washington Road

Pennsylvania Railroad New York to Philadelphia Historic District

See Main Entry / Filed Location:
Hudson County, Weehawken Township

Port Mercer Historic District 

Roughly bounded by D&R Canal, County Rte 533 and County Rte 569

Prehistoric Archaeological Site


Princeton Operating Station, AT&T Building 

3794 Brunswick Pike, US Route 1

Princeton Junction 2 Archaeological Site


RCA 1 Site


RCA 2 Archaeological Site


RCA 3 Archaeological Site
 

(Enlarged site boundaries; Previous )

RCA Nursery Archaeological Site


RCA Archaeological Site 
()

John Rogers House 

South Post Road

Sarnoff Site

Washington Road Elm Allee 

Washington Road (County Route 571)

(Between US Route 1 (Penns Neck circle) and the Delaware
and Raritan Canal)

Wastewater Facilities Archeological Site

References

Places
New Jersey-related lists